Victoria Catarina Heredia Tamez (born 28 May 1998) is a Mexican taekwondo athlete. She won the silver medal at the 2015 Pan Am Games on the women's 67 kg category.

References 

1996 births
Living people
Mexican female taekwondo practitioners
Sportspeople from Mexico City
People from General Terán, Nuevo León
Universiade medalists in taekwondo
Universiade silver medalists for Mexico
Universiade bronze medalists for Mexico
Pan American Games medalists in taekwondo
Pan American Games silver medalists for Mexico
Taekwondo practitioners at the 2015 Pan American Games
Pan American Taekwondo Championships medalists
Medalists at the 2017 Summer Universiade
Medalists at the 2015 Pan American Games
20th-century Mexican women
21st-century Mexican women